Boston College High School (also known as BC High) is an all-male, Jesuit, Catholic  college preparatory high school for grades 7-12 in  Boston, Massachusetts. It is located on Columbia Point in Dorchester.

History 

Boston College High School was founded in 1863 as Boston College. Boston College was founded to appeal to the rising number of Irish-Catholic immigrants living in Greater Boston. For most of its early history, BC offered a singular 7-year program corresponding to both high school and college. Its first entering class of 22 students ranged in age from 11 to 16 years. The curriculum was based on the Jesuit Ratio Studiorum, emphasizing Latin, Greek, philosophy and theology. While BC's mission was to "educate pupils in the principles and practice of the Catholic faith," its founding documents reflect the historical realities of the time. The great influx of immigrants to Boston in the nineteenth century corresponded with growing anti-Catholic sentiment among the city's aristocratic elite. As a result, BC's charter was revolutionary for its time in stating that "the profession of religion will not be a necessary condition for admission to the College." The high school shares its history with Boston College until 1910 when the college moved from its original location in the South End to its current in Chestnut Hill. By the start of the 20th century, BC's enrollment had reached nearly 500. Expansion of the South End buildings onto James Street enabled increased division between the high school and the college. The 1907 purchase of farmland for a new college campus in Chestnut Hill allowed BC High to fully expand into the South End buildings, though it remained a constituent part of Boston College until 1927 when it was separately incorporated. In 1950, BC High moved to its current location.

In 2002, Stephen F. Dawber was suspended from his teaching duties after accusations of sexual assault. This came just days after two other priests were accused of abuse about a decade prior. In 2005, Jesuit priest James Talbot, who was also a teacher and coach at the school, pleaded guilty to rape, assault with intent to rape, and three counts of assault and battery, related to two students he sexually abused during his time there. He was removed from the school in 1998 after allegations of sexual assault surfaced from his time at Cheverus High School in Portland, Maine.

Academics 
Boston College High School offers 27 Advanced Placement courses for its 1,397. In 2019–20, the average ACT score was 27, while the average SAT score was 1259.

Global Education 
The Hyde Center for Global Education was founded was established in 2012 with the gift of Lawrence Hyde, who was a member of the Class of 1942. The program offers a variety of international programs to 18 different countries.

Innovation 
In 2020, alumnus Jack Shields donated $5 million to establish the Shields Innovation Center. The program aims to "prioritize entrepreneurial thinking while preparing students for the rapidly evolving innovation economy". The program's curriculum will encourage students to become critical thinkers on society's most pressing issues, expand the alumni network and connections, and offer hands-on experience with technology. The program will connect students to innovators of the many companies in Greater Boston, including alumni of the school.

Facilities 
McElroy Hall is the original building of the present campus when it opened in 1950. Shortly after, Cushing Hall opened in 1953, followed by the new Jesuit residence, Loyola Hall, in 1957. The Walsh Hall Science Center opened in 1965. Walsh Hall was renovated in 2007 for the opening of the Arrupe Division, which serves grades 7-8. McQuillan Hall and Cadigan Hall are the two newest buildings on the campus. McQuillan Hall houses the new science center and cafeteria.

Cadigan Hall opened in 2013 after alumnus Pat Cadigan donated $12 million for a new "arts and recreation building". The hall features an atrium to facilitize alumni and outreach events. Cadigan Hall serves the art and music departments as well as the athletic program.

In the spring of 2016, Monan Park opened as the new home for the home for baseball at Boston College High School and the University of Massachusetts Boston. The complex features a baseball stadium with seating for 500 spectators and identical dimensions to Fenway Park, as well as a secondary field for baseball, lacrosse, and soccer. The joint project with the neighboring University of Massachusetts Boston was made possible with a $2 million donation from the Yawkey Foundation.

Extracurricular activities

Athletics 
Boston College High School teams are known as the Eagles, a name they share with Boston College. They compete as a member of the Massachusetts Interscholastic Athletic Association (MIAA) Division 1 level, competing in the Catholic Conference (CC). As of 2021, the school offered 20 varsity sports teams. Sponsored sports include baseball, basketball, cross country, football, golf, ice hockey, lacrosse, rowing, rugby, sailing, skiing, soccer, swimming and diving, tennis, track and field, ultimate, volleyball, and wrestling.

The mascot for all Boston College High School athletic teams is the Eagle, generally referred to in the plural, i.e., "The Eagles". The school colors are maroon and gold. The fight song is For Boston.

The football team has a long-standing rivalry with Catholic Memorial School. They have faced off every year since 1962. The winner of the Thanksgiving Day game wins the Pumpkin Trophy.

The 2009 Indoor Track Relay Team won the Massachusetts State Relays.
The baseball team won the State Finals in 2001, 2008 and 2009.
The soccer team won the Massachusetts State Championship in 2004. The hockey team has won the Super 8 hockey tournament six times, the second-most in the tournament's history, behind only conference rival Catholic Memorial School. In 2019, the team won the championship game at the TD Garden over Pope Francis Preparatory School 2–1 in 4OT to win their second-straight title, the longest game in tournament history. The BC High Lacrosse Team has won the Division 1 South Sectional Championship 4 times in the last 5 years: 2016, 2017, 2018, and 2021 (No Season in 2020 due to the Covid-19 Pandemic). The team won the Massachusetts Division 1 State Championship over Acton-Boxborough Regional High School in 2018 by a score of 16-3.

Principal athletic facilities include Edward T. Barry Ice Rink (capacity: 1,000), McNeice Pavillion, Monan Park (500), and Viola Stadium. BC High athletics has been considered one of the best programs in the nation. Specifically, the school was ranked #10 on Sports Illustrated's list of Top High School Athletic programs in 2007.

Notable alumni

Paul Benedict, actor
William Bulger (born 1934, class of 1952), politician,  former President of University of Massachusetts system
Tim Bulman, NFL defensive lineman
Joe Cannata, hockey player
Joe Callahan, NHL defenseman
Jim Carey (born 1974), former NHL player
Paul Carey (born 1968), former MLB player
General George W. Casey Jr. (born 1948, class of 1966), four-star general, Chief of Staff of the United States Army
David Chiu, president, San Francisco Board of Supervisors
Bob Clasby, NFL player
Thomas Cronin, political scientist and educator
Richard Cushing, Archbishop of Boston
Most Rev. John Michael D'Arcy, Bishop Emeritus of Fort Wayne-South Bend, former Auxiliary Bishop of Boston
Terry Driscoll (born 1947), NBA professional basketball player
Joseph F. Dunford Jr., four-star general, U.S. Marine Corps, Chairman of Joint Chiefs of Staff
Ed Gallagher (1910-1981, class of 1928), starting pitcher in Major League Baseball who played briefly for the Boston Red Sox during the 1932 season
Paul Guilfoyle, actor
Ken Hackett, Ambassador to the Holy See, retired president of Catholic Relief Services
Alex Hassan (born 1988), MLB player for Boston Red Sox
General Joseph P. Hoar, former Commander-in-Chief, United States Central Command
Ike Kamp (1900-1955), former MLB player (Boston Braves)
Thomas G. Kelley, recipient of Medal of Honor
Edward Thaddeus Lawton, Boston-born Catholic bishop in Nigeria
Pat Leahy, NHL hockey player
Dennis Lehane, author of Mystic River, Gone Baby Gone, Shutter Island
Theodore Marier, founder of St. Paul's Choir School, Harvard Square
Chris Marinelli, NFL football player, Denver Broncos, Indianapolis Colts
Edwin McDonough, actor
John A. McNeice Jr, philanthropist, former Chairman and CEO, Colonial Group
James P. Moran Sr., Boston Redskins player, father of Virginia politicians Jim Moran and Brian Moran
Nnamdi Obukwelu, NFL player, Indianapolis Colts 
Joe Nash, NFL player, Seattle Seahawks 
Jake O'Brien, professional basketball player 
Joseph T. O'Callahan, Catholic priest and recipient of Medal of Honor
Francis Patrick O'Connor, former Justice of Massachusetts Supreme Judicial Court 
Pietro Pezzati, painter
Mike Ryan, NHL hockey player
Walter V. Robinson, journalist
Paul Sally, professor of mathematics and Director of Undergraduate Studies at University of Chicago
Francis X. Shea, Jesuit academic who served as president of College of St. Scholastica and chancellor of Antioch College
Ryan Shea, professional hockey player for Chicago Blackhawks
Mike Sullivan, current head coach of Pittsburgh Penguins, former NHL hockey player
Steve Trapilo, NFL football player
Eric Turner, singer
Erik Vendt, Olympic swimmer, gold medalist 2008, silver medalist in both 2000 and 2004 Summer Olympics
Dan Wetzel, journalist
Jerry York, Boston College men's hockey head coach

References

External links

BC High official website

1863 establishments in Massachusetts
Boys' schools in Massachusetts
Catholic Conference (MIAA)
Catholic secondary schools in Massachusetts
Educational institutions established in 1863
High schools in Boston
Jesuit high schools in the United States
Sexual abuse scandal in the Society of Jesus